The Public Service Association or PSA is a democratic trade union 
that represents over  workers in the Aotearoa New Zealand public sector.
The aims of the PSA are:

 strong public and community services 
 a strong, modern and influential union 
 transformed work 
 equity in the workplace 
 with a commitment to advancing the principals of Te Tiriti o Waitangi in the working lives of the union's members

The PSA is affiliated to national and international organisations, including the New Zealand Council of Trade Unions and Public Services International,
but is forbidden, by its own rules, from affiliating with political parties or organisations.

History
Though its origins go back to 1890, The New Zealand Public Service Association officially dates from 31 October 1913.

The early history of the PSA is one of dogged resistance to cuts in pay and conditions. Public servants were poorly paid and were often forced to take pay cuts when the economy stalled. In 1931, for example, all public servant salaries were cut by 10%. Many public servants suffered acute hardship. It was only loans from the Public Service Investment Society, set up by the PSA in 1928, that prevented many of them falling into the clutches of loans sharks. Working conditions were sometimes poor and unhygienic. An overcrowded Wellington department was described by the PSA as "a compromise between a hot-house and a tin shed erected by amateur carpenters".

With a change of government in 1936, the PSA began to have some success with its advocacy for public servants. A five-day working week for public servants was introduced. Salaries were restored to 1931 levels, and public servants given the right to become politically involved.

By mid-century, the PSA was a confident, energetic organisation.  In 1950 membership was nearly 30,000, 83% of the total public service roll. A major focus of the 1950s was discrimination against women, which was built into the salary scales. By the end of the decade the PSA advocacy had borne fruit, with the passing of Government Service Equal Pay Act.

By the 1970s the PSA was again in resistance mode as pressure came on public sector pay as a result of an economic downturn. It was a decade of political turbulence and industrial unrest. In 1979 the PSA faced the biggest crisis in its existence. In response to notice of strike action by electricity workers, the Government introduced the Public Service Association Withdrawal of Recognition Bill. The bill would have given the Government the power of seize all the assets of the union and vest them in the Public Trustee.  In the face of mass protests and a PSA offer to submit the dispute to mediation, the Government backed down and withdrew the bill.
The 1980s presented more challenges. Privatisation of state assets and the restructuring of the public service saw thousands of PSA members made redundant. In 1987 the Government introduced the State Sector Bill which would have taken away most of the current conditions of employment. PSA members held massive protest meetings and a national strike in 1988. This ensured all current conditions were saved.

The early 1990s saw further attacks on unions. The Employment Contracts Act removed unions as a legal entity; unions were now called bargaining agents with very restricted rights.

In the late 1990s, the PSA began looking at ways to break out of the negative relationships which were so common in the workplace at that time. It worked with the Government and State Services Commission to reassess and rebuild a public service decimated by a decade of economic reforms. It developed a new strategy, Partnership for Quality, which sought constructive engagement with government and employers.

In 2000, the first Quality for Partnership Agreement was signed by the PSA and the Government. Though the current government has chosen not to enter into a formal partnership with the PSA, the union remains committed to constructive engagement at all levels of government and with employers. The PSA continues to be an effective voice for its members. In 2006 the union negotiated national pay rates for occupational groups in the health sector and has been successful in breaking the de facto wage freeze imposed on the public service with wage settlements in a number of large departments.

In 2010 the union successfully negotiated a collective employment agreement for its 6000 local government members in Auckland when eight councils and a large number of council-controlled organisations were amalgamated into a single Auckland council.

Despite continuous cuts and restructuring in the public sector and legislation aimed at reducing the effectiveness of unions, PSA membership continues to grow, particularly in community-based services.

Governance
One of the PSA's values is to be:

Workplaces and sectors
Each PSA member in a workplace pays a membership subscription fee.
Those fees provide the vast majority of the union's income.

Workplaces are grouped into five sectors:
 Public Service
 District Health Boards 
 State Sector
 Local Government
 Community Public Services

Groups
Members may also belong to national groups, and the following groups are represented on the union's committees:
 Te Rūnanga o Ngā Toa Āwhina: for those who identify as Māori
 Pasefika Network: for those who identify as Pacific Island people
 PSA Youth: for those who are aged 35 and under

Meetings and committees
Each workplace has an annual meeting where members elect volunteers from the membership as delegates to represent their interests.
The delegates form a workplace committee then elect a convenor.
Delegate committees have positions for Te Rūnanga o Ngā Toa Āwhina and Pasefika Network.

Having consulted their members, the delegates in a sector elect their peers to the sector committee.
The delegates on each sector committee elect two co-convenors, at least one of whom must be a woman, 
and the committee includes delegates from Te Rūnanga o Ngā Toa Āwhina, Pasefika Network and PSA Youth.

Every two years a national delegates' congress is held. 
Congress is the highest decision-making body of the PSA setting overall policy direction and electing the president.
The current president Benedict Ferguson was elected in 2020.

In between congresses, the executive board sets and oversees the implementation of policy.
The board includes the president and leaders of the sector committees, Te Rūnanga o Ngā Toa Āwhina, Pasefika Network and PSA Youth.

Congress, the board, the sector and Te Rūnanga o Ngā Toa Āwhina committees
aim for gender equity with the gender balance of each one reflecting that of the membership they represent.

Notes

References

Books
 No Easy Victory: Towards equal pay for women in the government service, 1890–1960 by Margaret Corner
 White-collar Radical:Dan Long and the rise of the white-collar unions by Mark Derby

External links 

PSA Campaigns website

Trade unions in New Zealand
New Zealand Council of Trade Unions
Public Services International
Trade unions established in 1913
1913 establishments in New Zealand